Jacek Kurzawiński (24 February 1962 – 17 November 2019) was a Polish professional volleyball head coach qualified by FIVB and FFVB. From 2016, he was the head coach of Chełmiec Wałbrzych, a women's volleyball team in Polish Division III.

Kurzawiński was born in Wałbrzych. He was a member of the Polish junior team which won the European Junior Championship named "Friendship Tournament" in 1978. He made his debut in the senior squad during 1979 summer season and he was member of Polish National Team until 1982.

Clubs as player
 Chełmiec Wałbrzych
 Resovia Rzeszów
 Gwardia Wrocław
 PTT Ankara
 Chełmiec Wałbrzych
 HAC Le Havre
 ALCM Maromme - Canteleu

Career highlights
 1983 Cup of Poland with Resovia Rzeszów
 1983 4th Polish Championship with Resovia Rzeszów
 1984 4th Polish Championship with Resovia Rzeszów
 1986 4th Polish Championship with Gwardia Wrocław
 1993 Cup of Poland with Chełmiec Wałbrzych
 1994 4th Polish Championship with Chełmiec Wałbrzych
 1994 Quarter Final in CEV Cup with Chełmiec Wałbrzych

Individual awards
 1977 The best Polish setter in Junior Championship of Poland

Coaching history 
Kurzawinski was the top assistant coach and recruiter under head coach for Chełmiec Wałbrzych from 1993-1994. 
After leaving Walbrzych, Kurzawinski was the player-coach of the Le Havre in France for season. In his first season there, the Hotvolleys won the Coupe of Normandie. For the next year Jacek Kurzawinski found employment in Maromme for the 4 seasons like a head coach in second league. Six years later he returned to France to Angoulême (second league). Next season he was player-coach in Annecy (5th place in second league) and changed employment to AL Caudry in season 2007/2008. In season 2008/2009 he was a head coach of Joker Pila team in PRO B and next season he tried for promotion to PRO B with other Silesian team Sudety Kamienna Góra. Before 2010/2011 season he found employment in Harnes (France) in PRO B of women league (7th place). In season 2011/2012 Jacek Kurzawinski extended his contract with Harnesien Volleyball. In 2016, he returned to his hometown to reactivate Chełmiec Wałbrzych women's team in Division III Polish league.

Coaching clubs
 Chełmiec Wałbrzych
 HAC Le Havre
 ALCM Maromme-Canteleu
 SCA Angoulême
 VB Annecy
 AL Caudry
 Joker Piła women
 Sudety Kamienna Góra
 Harnes VB women
 Chełmiec Wałbrzych women

References

1962 births
2019 deaths
Polish men's volleyball players
People from Wałbrzych
Polish volleyball coaches
Sportspeople from Lower Silesian Voivodeship
Resovia (volleyball) players